Hahnfjella is a mountain group in Sabine Land at Spitsbergen, Svalbard, west of the bay of Wichebukta. It is named after German geographer Friedrich Gustav Hahn. The highest mountain of the group reaches 537 m.a.s.l.

References

Mountains of Spitsbergen